Ingrian is a nearly extinct Finnic language of Russia. The spoken language remains unstandardised, and as such statements below are about the four known dialects of Ingrian (Ala-Laukaa, Hevaha, Soikkola and Ylä-Laukaa) and in particular the two extant dialects (Ala-Laukaa and Soikkola).

The written forms are, if possible, based on the written language (referred to as kirjakeeli, "book language") introduced by the Ingrian linguist  in the late 1930s. Following 1937's mass repressions in the Soviet Union, the written language was abolished and ever since, Ingrian doesn't have a (standardised) written language.

Vowels

The following chart shows the monophthongs present in the Ingrian language:

All vowels can occur as both short and long. The long vowel  is extremely rare, occurring in borrowed words like rььžo ("red-haired").

Diphthongs
Besides the diphthongs that arise due to diphthongation of the long mid vowels, Ingrian has a wide range of phonemic diphthongs, present in both dialects:

Ingrian has only one falling phonemic diphthong, iä, which is only present in the personal pronouns miä ("I") and siä ("you", singular).

Vowel reduction
Vowel reduction is a very common feature of the Ala-Laukaa dialect, and is to a very restricted extent also present in Soikkola. The term refers to the process of acoustically weakening the unstressed vowels.

 linna  ("city")
 ilma  ("weather")

In Ala-Laukaa, this process is much more common. The process of reducing vowels is contrastive in Ala-Laukaa:
 linna  ("city", nom) linnaa  ("city", part)
In a closed final syllable, the reduction of the vowel  is much more uncommon, and occurs primarily in polisyllabic words. In words with three syllables and a long third syllable (in the form CVV), the penultimate syllable will reduce in the same way as described above. In polysyllabic words, reduction of the even syllables doesn't occur before short syllables.

The reduced vowels in Ala-Laukaa Ingrian can further experience deletion:
 istuisi ("he/she sat down")

Vowel harmony

Ingrian, just like its closest relatives Finnish and Karelian, has the concept of vowel harmony. The principle of this morphophonetic phenomenon is that vowels in a word consisting of one root are all either front or back. As such, no native words can have any of the vowels {a, o, u} together with any of the vowels {ä, ö, y}.

To harmonise formed words, any suffix containing one of these six vowels have two separate forms: a front vowel form and a back vowel form. Compare the following two words, formed using the suffix -kas: liivakas ("sandy") from liiva ("sand") and iäkäs ("elderly") from ikä ("age").

The vowels {e, i} are considered neutral and can co-occur with both types of vowels. However, stems with these vowels are always front vowel harmonic: kivekäs ("rocky") from kivi ("rock").

Compound words don't have to abide by the rules of vowel harmony, since they consist of two stems: rantakivi ("coastal stone") from ranta ("coast") + kivi ("stone").

Consonants
The consonantal phonology of Ingrian varies greatly among dialects. For example, while Soikkola Ingrian misses the voiced-unvoiced distinction, it has a three-way consonant length distinction, missing in the Ala-Laukaa dialect.

Soikkola dialect

 The velar nasal  is a form of  occurring before the plosive  (written ⟨nk⟩).
  is most commonly realised as the palatalised 
  may be realised as the consonant cluster .

Consonant length

In the Soikkola dialect, consonants have a three-way distinction in length. Geminates can be either short (1.5 times the length of a short consonant) or long (twice the length of a short consonant):
 tapa  ("character" nom)
 tappaa  ("he/she catches" also: "character" part)
 tappaa  ("to kill")
A similar phenomenon can be observed in the related Estonian language.

A word with the underlying structure *(C)VCVCV(C) is geminated to (C)VCˑVːCV(C) in the Soikkola dialect:
 omena  ("apple" nom; respelled ommeena)
 omenan  ("apple" gen; respelled ommeenan)
 orava  ("squirrel" nom; respelled orraava)
This rule however does not apply to forms that are underlyingly tetrasyllabic:
 omenaal (< *omenalla)  ("apple" ade)
 omenaks (< *omenaksi)  ("apple" tra)

Consonant voicing
The Soikkola dialect also exhibits a phonetic three-way voicing distinction for plosives and the sibilant:
 poika , 
 poikaa , 
 When preceding a hiatus, word-final consonants are also semi-voiced. When not, voicing assimilation occurs, resulting in voiced consonants before voiced consonants and vowels, and voiceless consonants before voiceless consonants:
 pojat , 
 pojat nooret , 
 pojat suuret , 
 pojat ovat , 
 Word-initially, plosives and sibilants are generally voiceless. Some speakers, however, may pronounce Russian loanwords, deriving from Russian words with a word-initial voiced plosive, with a voiced initial consonant:
 bocka  ~ ; compare also pocka

Nasal assimilation
A word-final dental nasal assimilates to the following stop and nasal:
 meehen poika 
 meehen koira 
 kanan muna 
Some speakers also assimilate word-final  to a following liquid, glottal fricative or bilabial approximant:
 meehen laps 
 joen ranta 
 miul on vene 
 varis on harmaa

Ala-Laukaa dialect

  may be realised as the consonant cluster .
  sometimes corresponds to Soikkola  and is thus written ⟨c⟩: compare mancikka (Soikkola , Ala-Laukaa ).

Palatalisation
In the Ala-Laukaa dialect, phonetic palatalisation of consonants in native words occurs first of all before the vowels {y, i} and the approximant :
 tyttö  ("girl"); compare Soikkola  and Standard Finnish .
Furthermore, palatalisation before  and  that have developed from an earlier * or * respectively is rare:
 töö  ("you (plural)")
The cluster ⟨lj⟩ is realised as a long palatalised consonant in the Ala-Laukaa dialect:
 neljä  ("four"); compare Soikkola 
 paljo  ("many"); compare Soikkola 
 kiljua  ("to shout"); compare Standard Finnish 
These same phenomena are noticed in the extinct Ylä-Laukaa dialect:
 tyttö  ("girl")
 neljä  ("four")

Sibilant voicing
At the end of a word, the sibilant ⟨s⟩ is voiced:
 lammas  ("sheep")
 mees  ("man")
Like in the Soikkola dialect, when preceding a word beginning with a voiceless stop, this sibilant is again devoiced:
 lammas pellool 
 mees kyläs

Prosody

Stress
Stress in Ingrian falls on the first syllable in native words, but may be shifted in loanwords. An exception is the word paraikaa ("now"), where the stress falls on the second syllable. Secondary stress falls on odd-numbered syllables or occurs as a result of compounding and isn't phonemic.

References

Ingrian language
Uralic phonologies